Pisonia grandis, the grand devil's-claws, is a species of flowering tree in the Bougainvillea family, Nyctaginaceae.

Description
The tree has broad, thin leaves, smooth bark and bears clusters of green sweet-smelling flowers that mature into sticky barbed seeds.

Dispersal occurs when seeds stick to bird feathers. Vegetative reproduction frequently results when fallen branches sprout or basal shoots develop into new trees.

Distribution
Pisonia trees are distributed throughout the coral cays of the Indian and Pacific Oceans. Pisonia wood is rather weak and soft and decays rapidly when the trees fall.

Pisonia forests are a common nesting site for seabirds. One of the best remaining Pisonia forests can be found on Palmyra Atoll.

St. Pierre Island, Farquhar Group, was once covered by a Pisonia grandis forest. This forest disappeared after guano mining between 1906 and 1972. The natural vegetation was destroyed in order to scrape the guano and the island's landscape became barren.

Uses
The leaves are traditionally used as a leaf vegetable in some countries. They were part of the traditional Maldivian cuisine in dishes such as mas huni.

References

External links

 Nature Seychelles - Seabird deaths caused by P. grandis. Accessed 4 Aug 2019.
Eating on the Islands - As times have changed, so has the Maldives' unique cuisine and culture

grandis
Caryophyllales of Australia
Flora of the Coral Sea Islands Territory
Flora of the Maldives
Flora of Malesia
Flora of the Pacific
Flora of Queensland